Rubellatoma is a genus of sea snails, marine gastropod mollusks in the family Mangeliidae

Species
Species within the genus Rubellatoma include:
 Rubellatoma diomedea Bartsch & Rehder, 1939
 Rubellatoma rubella (Kurtz & Stimpson, 1851)
 Rubellatoma rufocincta  (E.A. Smith, 1882)
Species brought into synonymy
 Rubellatoma elata (Dall, 1889): synonym of Platycythara elata (Dall, 1889)

References

 Bartsch, Paul, and Harald A. Rehder. "New turritid mollusks from Florida." Proceedings of the United States National Museum (1939).

External links
 Todd, Jonathan A. "Systematic list of gastropods in the Panama Paleontology Project collections." Budd and Foster 2006 (1996)
  Bouchet P., Kantor Yu.I., Sysoev A. & Puillandre N. (2011) A new operational classification of the Conoidea. Journal of Molluscan Studies 77: 273-308.
 
 Worldwide Mollusc Species Data Base: Mangeliidae

 
Gastropod genera